XHMBM-FM is a noncommercial radio station in Guadalajara, Jalisco, Mexico. It broadcasts on 105.1 FM and is known as Milenio Bella Música, carrying a classical music format. XHMBM is owned by Mi Gran Esperanza, A.C. ("My Great Hope"), a civil association devoted to serving children with cancer, and operated by Promomedios from its studios and transmission facility in the Verde Valle neighborhood of Guadalajara.

History
The station received its permit in 1999.

XHMBM carries classical music and also transmits appeals for donations to Mi Gran Esperanza.

In 2018, XHMBM was approved for a major power increase to 45 kW.

References

External links
Mi Gran Esperanza website

Radio stations in Guadalajara
Radio stations established in 1999
1999 establishments in Mexico